Events from the year 1998 in the British Virgin Islands.

Incumbents
Governor: Frank Savage
Chief Minister: Ralph T. O'Neal

September
 21 September 1998 - Hurricane Georges strikes the British Virgin Islands.

Footnotes

 
1990s in the British Virgin Islands
British Virgin Islands